Otto Huttunen (born May 7, 1991) is a Finnish professional ice hockey defenceman playing for KalPa of Liiga.

Huttunen previously played for Iisalmen Peli-Karhut and captained the team for three seasons in Mestis before joining KalPa on August 26, 2019. In his debut season in Liiga, Huttunen played 45 games and scored four goals and six assists. He re-signed with the team on March 25, 2020.

References

External links

1991 births
Living people
Finnish ice hockey defencemen
Iisalmen Peli-Karhut players
KalPa players
People from Iisalmi
Sportspeople from North Savo